The word Oga is a Pidgin word which means "senior or boss." The phrase "my oga at the top" may be used to show respect to someone in a position of authority.

For example, in a question like this: "When will you pay my debt?" Reply: "My oga at the top has not paid my salary."

The phrase is common in Nigeria, used in public and government offices, and became very popular when Channels TV's morning program Sunrise Daily interviewed Obafaiye Shem, the Lagos State Commandant of the Nigeria Security and Civil Defence Corps on the need to know the correct website of the corp to avoid misleading job seekers.
He was asked, "What is the website of the NSCDC?" And he responded, "I cannot categorically tell you one now." He was asked again, "Do you mean that NSCDC has multiple websites?" He responded, "We can't have multiple websites but I cannot tell you one now, and “My Oga At The Top” say is another one and the one we are going to make use of will be made known by “My Oga At The Top”. Nigerians considered his response inappropriate and it went viral.

References

English phrases